Pandrol is a global rail technology company, founded in 1953 and operating in over 100 countries worldwide, with over 400 railway systems having adopted its products.

A member of the Delachaux Group, Pandrol is based in Colombes, France and has 1700 employees globally in over 40 locations. In 2020, they achieved a turnover of £60.9M.

Pandrol primarily manufactures rail fastenings, which are used to fasten rails to railway ties. They are also an industry leader in aluminothermic welding, whereby metals are rapidly heated to repair and connect pieces of rail. Pandrol designs, develops and manufactures a variety of equipment to make constructing and maintaining railways more efficient.

Overview 
The Pandrol clip was patented in 1957 by a Norwegian railways engineer, Per Pande-Rolfsen. It is now common worldwide. The original clip is now called the PR-clip, which was superseded by a system called E-Clip.

Pandrol has a range of sustainable resilient systems and battery powered tools called E+. Each E+ product has been designed to cut carbon emissions without compromising power. A focus on reducing noise and eliminating dangerous fumes will contribute to reduced environmental impact, particularly in urban and under-tunnel areas.

History 
In the 1930s, a German engineer, Max Rüping, developed a resilient fastening to secure a rail to a sleeper. In 1933, he went into business with an American importer of Creosote named Oscar Max von Bernuth (O. M. Bernuth), founder of Bernuth-Lembcke Company.

At the time, the fastening was known as the Elastic Rail Spike. The product was successful in track tests and the Elastic Rail Spike Company (ERS) was formed in London in 1937.

Throughout the 1940s, the business expanded internationally, led by General Manager Stewart Sanson. Patents were registered across the globe, including in India and Burma in 1943.

Immediately after the Second World War, ERS acquired a lease on a government-owned factory in Worksop to undertake spike production. This has remained Pandrol’s UK manufacturing base to the present day.

In 1958, Sanson was approached by a young Norwegian engineer named Per Pande-Rolfsen, who had invented a new type of indirect fastening which was fullly resilient and did not transmit vibrations from passing trains. The self-tensioning spring clip was far more adaptable than any other product on the market, and ERS registered international licensing rights on behalf of Rolfsen. Taking two syllables from the name of its creator, the indirect fastening was christened ‘the Pandrol clip’, or the PR clip. In 1966, it was adopted as standard by British Railways, with South African Railways following in 1967.

References 

 

Rail infrastructure manufacturers
Rail fastening systems
Manufacturing companies of the United Kingdom
Manufacturing companies established in 1937
1937 establishments in England